Frank A. Cappello is an American filmmaker. His credits include writing the screenplay for Constantine and writing, directing and producing He Was a Quiet Man.

Filmography

References

External links

American film directors
Living people
Year of birth missing (living people)
American film producers
American male screenwriters